The Church of St Margaret of Scotland is a church dedicated to St Margaret, Queen of Scotland, and may refer to:

Church of St Margaret of Scotland, Woodville, Anglican church in Adelaide, South Australia
 Church of St Margaret of Scotland, Twickenham, Roman Catholic church in London
 St Margaret of Scotland, Aberdeen, Episcopal church
 St Margaret the Queen, Buxted, Anglican church in East Sussex, England
 St Margaret's Chapel, Edinburgh, chapel of Edinburgh Castle, Scotland

See also
 St. Margaret's Church (disambiguation), for dedications to other saints